Rumfuddle is a science fiction story by Jack Vance published in ‘’Three Trips in Time and Space’’, a 1973 anthology of original science fiction novellas edited by Robert Silverberg.  In Rumfuddle, a genius scientist named Alan Robertson has discovered that there are an infinite number of parallel universes. He creates a machine that can inexpensively access portals between universes that are similar to our own, which he calls “cognates”.  At first, this technological leap leads to positive effects, such as infinite access to natural resources from other parallel worlds. As time goes on, though, people realize that this new power may have negative consequences.

Plot

San Francisco-based scientist Alan Robertson discovers portals to parallel universes and worlds. At first, this is heralded as a great benefit, as it has created a post-scarcity society; any raw resources can be harvested by going through a portal and getting them from a planet in another universe. As well, the problems of overpopulation and the resultant shortage of living space is also solved, because every family can live in a different parallel universe’s Earth-like world.

Many other fields are revolutionized, because the portal device can also transport you to other time periods, like a time machine. As such, a historian can travel back hundreds, thousands, or even millions of years to observe the world. Despite the technology’s benefits, Alan worries that it may lead to “new vices” and decadent lifestyles.

One example of the problems that the portals can cause is the use of the technology by Alan’s adult son Bob. Bob gives access to the portal device to a small group of friends, who he calls "Rumfuddlers,"  to set up complex practical jokes that change historical figures. The Rumfuddlers turn Nazi leader Hitler into a kosher restaurant worker and they make Marx, Lenin and Stalin into servants to Czar Nicholas. 

Alan Robertson’s adopted grandson, now an adult, is a construction worker named Gilbert Duray. Gilbert is a bulldozer operator for Robertson’s company. As so many Old Earth inhabitants are living in parallel worlds, entire Earth towns have been abandoned. Gilbert’s job is to bulldoze the empty houses and businesses and then take the waste to a parallel world for disposal. With this work, former towns are converting back to natural forests.

Gilbert works on Earth but lives with his wife Elizabeth and three daughters in a parallel Earth-like planet called “Home” that he accesses via the portal.  He travels through the portal to work in his the Old Earth, then returns to the Home planet in the evening. At the end of his day bulldozing Earth towns, Gilbert finds that he cannot access the portal to Home. Gilbert thinks the portal might be shut to him because he refused to meet his Grandfather’s elite friends, the practical joke-playing “rumfuddlers”.  If the portal is permanently closed, this would mean his wife would be stuck in Home forever, all alone.

Gilbert asks this Grandfather Alan for help getting the portal to Home opened up, but Alan says he is not able to control the activities of Bob’s “Rumfuddlers”.  The Rumfuddlers’ jokes and meddling in parallel worlds is getting increasingly complex and problematic. Alan does not agree with these activities, but he cannot get Bob and his friends to stop. Gilbert suspects that his loss of access to his wife and the Home world may be due to a Rumfuddler intervention.

Eventually, the reader learns that there are multiple Gilberts and multiple Elizabeths in different parallel worlds, with the copies being fairly close to the originals but not quite the same. Gilbert learns that Elizabeth has cooperated with the Rumfuddlers in closing off Gilbert’s portal to her, for reasons that Gilbert does not understand. Elizabeth eventually seeks to spend time with a number of different Gilberts on different parallel worlds.

Reception

The story is a parable about the dangers of new technologies and the unintended consequences that scientific innovations can produce.

Short stories by Jack Vance